Roslyn station is a SEPTA Regional Rail station in Roslyn, Pennsylvania. Located at the intersection of Easton and Susquehanna Roads, it serves the Warminster Line.

The original station was built by the Reading Railroad. The building was demolished in 1980 in favor of a modern facility. The station has a parking lot with 61 spaces.  In FY 2017, Roslyn station had a weekday average of 285 boardings and 238 alightings. Prior to 2010, Roslyn station was where the Warminster Line ended double-track operation. Since then, the interlocking has been moved roughly 1/2 mile farther back. This station is wheelchair ADA accessible.

Station layout

References

External links
SEPTA - Roslyn Station
 Station from Google Maps Street View

SEPTA Regional Rail stations
Stations on the Warminster Line
Railway stations in Montgomery County, Pennsylvania